is a Japanese professional footballer who plays for AZ Alkmaar in the Eredivisie.

Club career

Nagoya Grampus
Sugawara made his debut for Nagoya Grampus on 24 February 2018, the opening day of the 2018 season in a match against Gamba Osaka. In doing so, he became the second youngest player to appear in J1 League match ever at 17 years, 7 months and 27 days, only passed by former Gamba Osaka player Junichi Inamoto in 1997. On 6 April 2018, Sugawara signed his first professional contract with Nagoya Grampus, the youngest in the club's history to sign a professional deal, at 17 years and 10 months.

Loan to AZ
Sugawara joined Dutch Eredivisie club AZ on 21 June 2019 on a season-long loan. He made his first-team debut on 25 July, as a 59th-minute substitute during AZ's 0–0 home draw against BK Häcken in the second qualifying round of the Europa League. At AZ he was mainly utilised as a right back, where he competed with the older Jonas Svensson, and was set to become his future successor. On 4 August 2019, Sugawara started in the home match against Fortuna Sittard and scored the final goal in the 84th minute, to make it 4–0 after preliminary work by Calvin Stengs. Both in the league and group stage of the 2019–20 UEFA Europa League, Sugawara was a regular rotational player during the season, while also making some appearances for the reserve team of Jong AZ in the second-tier Eerste Divisie. During this season he played 16 league games in which he scored two goals. [8]

AZ
On 23 February 2020, it was announced that Sugawara would sign a five-year contract to join AZ permanently from 1 June 2020.

International career
Sugawara represented Japan at the 2017 FIFA U-17 World Cup. Sugawara made his debut with the senior Japan national team in a friendly 0–0 tie with Cameroon on 9 October 2020.

Career statistics

Honours
Japan U19
AFC U-19 Championship third place: 2018

Individual
Eredivisie Talent of the Month: January 2022

References

External links

Profile at Nagoya Grampus

2000 births
Living people
People from Toyokawa, Aichi
Association football people from Aichi Prefecture
Japanese footballers
Japan youth international footballers
Japan under-20 international footballers
Japan international footballers
Association football defenders
Nagoya Grampus players
Eerste Divisie players
AZ Alkmaar players
Jong AZ players
J1 League players
Eredivisie players
Japanese expatriate footballers
Expatriate footballers in the Netherlands
Japanese expatriate sportspeople in the Netherlands